"Compliqué" is a song by Dadju from his album Poison ou Antidote. It was released on 28 June 2019.

Charts

Weekly charts

Year-end charts

Certifications

References

2019 songs
2019 singles
Dadju songs
French-language songs